Sir Robert Constable (c. 1478 – 6 July 1537) was a member of the English Tudor gentry. He helped Henry VII to defeat the Cornish rebels at the Battle of Blackheath in 1497. In 1536, when the rising known as the Pilgrimage of Grace broke out in the north of England, Constable was one of the insurgent leaders, but towards the close of the year, he submitted at Doncaster and was pardoned. He did not share in the renewal of the rising, Bigod's rebellion, which took place in January 1537; but he refused the king's invitation to proceed to London, and was arrested, tried for treason, and hanged at Hull in the following June.

Family
Born at Flamborough in Yorkshire, Robert Constable was the eldest son of Sir Marmaduke Constable (1456/7 – 20 November 1518) and his second wife, Joyce Stafford. His paternal grandparents were Sir Robert Constable of Flamborough, Yorkshire, and Agnes Wentworth, daughter of Sir Roger Wentworth, esquire, of Nettlestead, Suffolk, and Margery le Despencer. Constable's maternal uncle, Sir Humphrey Stafford (c. 1426/7 – 8 July 1486), was executed at Tyburn for his part in an insurrection against King Henry VII.

Early life
In his youth Constable carried off a ward of Chancery, and tried to marry her to one of his retainers. 

In the reign of Henry VII, he was of signal service to the crown upon the Cornish Rebellion led by Lord Audley, who marched on London and was defeated at the battle of Blackheath in 1497. Constable was one of the knights bannerets that were created at Blackheath by Henry VII after his victory on 17 June 1497. In the following reign, he was also at Flodden.

Pilgrimage of Grace
In 1536, on the outbreak of the great Yorkshire rising, known as the Pilgrimage of Grace, caused by the beginning of the destruction of monasteries in 1536, he took the leading part, along with Robert Aske and Lord Darcy. Constable was among those who made their submission, and received their pardon. At the beginning of the next year, January 1537, when Sir Francis Bigod rashly attempted to renew the insurrection, Constable exerted himself to keep the country quiet. When this last commotion was over, he, like the other leaders, was invited by King Henry VIII to proceed to London. This he refused, and at the same time removed for safety from his usual place of abode to a dwelling thirty miles away.

Hereupon the powerful minister Thomas Cromwell caused the Duke of Norfolk to send him up with a sergeant-at-arms on 8 March. He with Aske and Darcy was committed to the Tower till they should be tried, and meantime Norfolk was directed to say in the north that they were imprisoned, not for their former offences, but for treasons committed since their pardon. What those treasons were the Duke was conveniently forbidden to say. There was 'no speciality to be touched or spoken of', but all 'conveyed in a mass together'. True bills were returned against them, and after their condemnation, it seemed to the King 'not amiss' that some of them should be remitted to their county for execution, 'as well for example as to see who would groan'. Constable and Aske were therefore sent down to Yorkshire, and exhibited as traitors in the towns through which they passed.

Constable was executed at Hull on 6 July 1537 being hanged in chains over Beverley gate at Hull, and thereby forfeited Flamborough and 35 other manors in Lincolnshire. The Duke of Norfolk witnessed his execution;

Issue
Sir Robert was married to Jane Ingleby of Ripley (b. 1472) in 1492, probably in Yorkshire, England. Jane's parents were Sir William Ingleby of Ripley, son of John Ingleby of Ripley and Margaret Strangeways, Baroness Willoughby, and his wife Catherine Stillington, daughter of Thomas Stillington of Nether Acaster and Agnes Bigod.

Sir Robert and Jane had the following issue:
 Sir Marmaduke Constable of Nuneaton (1498/1502 – 20 April 1560), married Elizabeth Darcy, daughter of Lord Darcy. Had issue.
 Catherine Constable (c. 1498–1585), married Sir Roger Cholmeley of Roxby (d. 1538). Had issue.
 Thomas Constable of Great Grimsby (c. 1504 – aft. 1558), MP, married 1st Barbara Catherall, and secondly a daughter of Robert Haldenby of Haldenby. He had issue by both wives.
 Joyce Constable (b. circa 1500), married Rowland Pudsey. No issue.
 Anne Constable (b. circa 1504), who married George Hussey (d. 10 August 1537) of Harswell and North Duffield, Yorkshire, son and heir of Sir William Hussey (d. 1531) by Anne Salvaine, and had issue three sons, John, Robert and William, and one daughter, Frances.
 Jane Constable, married Thomas Rokeby of Mortham, and had issue, including Christopher Rokeby and the judge Ralph Rokeby.

In fiction
He is a major character in The Man on a Donkey by H F M Prescott.

Ancestry

Notes

References
 
  
 
 
 
 
 

 Attribution

1470s births
1537 deaths
English Roman Catholics
People executed under the Tudors for treason against England
Recipients of English royal pardons
15th-century English people
16th-century English people
People from Flamborough
Executed people from the East Riding of Yorkshire
English knights
15th-century Roman Catholics
16th-century Roman Catholics
People executed by the Kingdom of England by hanging
People executed under Henry VIII
Knights banneret of England